Wasted Love may refer to:

"Wasted Love" (City and Colour song), from the 2015 City and Colour album If I Should Go Before You
"Wasted Love" (Matt McAndrew song), 2014
"Wasted Love" (Ofenbach song) featuring Lagique, 2021
"Wasted Love" (Steve Angello song), 2014

See also
"Waste Love", a track from the 2019 Machine Gun Kelly album Hotel Diablo
Wasted (disambiguation)